Mr. Young is a Canadian television series that premiered on March 1, 2011, on YTV. The series was filmed in Burnaby, British Columbia. The series was created by Dan Signer (who also worked on Disney Channel series such as The Suite Life on Deck and A.N.T. Farm), and stars Brendan Meyer, Matreya Fedor, and Gig Morton as attendees of Finnegan High School. Further main cast includes Kurt Ostlund, Emily Tennant, and Milo Shandel. The show ended its run on November 28, 2013, with three seasons and 80 episodes.

Premise
Mr. Young centers on Adam Young (Brendan Meyer), a child prodigy who graduated from university at the age of 14. He decides to come back to high school as a science teacher to live the high school "experience". He reunites with childhood best friend Derby (Gig Morton) and encounters the school bully, Slab (Kurt Ostlund), and a student in his class whom he has a crush on, named Echo (Matreya Fedor). However, because he is only 14, his students have little respect for him, and he often gets into trouble with the principal for his childlike behaviour.

Episodes

Cast and characters

Main
 Brendan Meyer as Adam Young. He is a child prodigy that is teaching science class at Finnegan High School. He wants to relive his life in high school because he graduated early and couldn't go to high school. But for him, life in high school is very difficult, as he lacks adequate social skills. He is also in love with one of his students, Echo. In almost every episode, Derby tries to help Adam impress Echo which all fail from Derby's impulsivity. Adam and Echo kiss in the 90 minute special (after a lot of work that makes him go back to or refer to previous episodes, such as Mr. Elephant, Mr. Magic and Mr. Dance, Mr. First Impression). In the finale, he's no longer in Finnegan and begins work at a local university as a professor. Adam Young is similar to Doogie Howser, M.D., who also graduated from high school and college at a young age.  He started out as a science teacher at 14.
 Matreya Fedor as Echo Zizzleswift. Echo is a student at Finnegan High School. She is in Adam's science class. Echo also cares deeply about the environment and other people. She is thoughtful, socially aware, a tad bit gullible, and secretly likes all things to do with science-fiction. She is good friends and sometimes enemies with Adam, Ivy, Derby and Slab. Adam has a crush on her, but she seems completely unaware of this (until in Mr. Double Date, where she discovers their mutual attraction). They kissed in the 90 minute special, Mr. First Impression. Her last name was announced in "Mr. College". She has a pet hamster named Mr. Tickleschmootz who later mated with Slab's hamster Slab Jr. In the finale, she graduates Finnegan and attends Adam's science class at a local university. 
 Gig Morton as Derby von Derbotsford. Derby is a dimwitted student at Finnegan High School. He has a crush on Ivy, Adam's sister, but is always rejected and ignored by her. He also has a tendency to wear and provide costumes and hosts a radio show called "Drive Time with Derby". Derby is Adam's best friend and also his student, a line that Derby's more than happy to blur; almost every time Adam teaches, he falls asleep as do many of the other students, whenever someone ask him something (either mild or difficult) he'll usually just says "I don't understand the question" such as having costumes provided when it was time for picture day while Adam and the other students gotten dirty clothes. Derby is a class clown and is skilled in pranking, with an alter ego "Gagmeister General". Principal Tater doesn't know the true identity of the "Gagmeister", even after Derby admitted to being him. In the 90-minute special, Mr. First Impression, he sings a song named "Derby Style", a parody of Gangnam Style. In the finale, he graduates from Finnegan and currently attends Adam's science class at a local university.
 Kurt Ostlund as Jordan 'Slab' Slabinsky. Slab is the doltish bully of Finnegan High School. Though his behavior is aggressive, Slab likes doing ballet, looking at the stars, and friendship. Though he tends to pull pranks on people, and bullies nerds specifically, he says he does it to conceal his feelings. Even though he bullies Derby often by putting him in trash cans, he occasionally helps him out. Although he is a bully, he does have feelings for other people such as Brap, a girl raised by elephants who was subsequently changed into a stereotypical popular girl by Ivy. He also has a fear of milk. He has two gerbils, two guinea pigs and a hamster who mated with Echo's hamster Mr. Tickleschmootz, all named Slab Jr. In Mr. Memory, he starts dating Ivy. In the finale, after 12 years of high school, he finally graduates from Finnegan and currently attends Adam's science class at a local university.
 Emily Tennant as Ivy Young. Ivy is Adam's rude older sister. She loves shopping and bossing Adam around. She is very dimwitted. She tends to be rude to a lot of people, sometimes even to the teachers, although deep down she truly does care about Adam and other people and will help them out. She used to have a crush on Hutch Anderson, but begins dating Slab in Mr. Memory. Ivy is a stereotypical blonde and is considered attractive by all the male students. In the series finale, it was revealed she was a senior for 3 years. She also is a reporter for the school newspaper, along with Echo. In the series finale, she finally graduates from Finnegan and currently attends her brother's science class at a local university.
 Milo Shandel as Principal George Tater. Principal Tater is the principal of Finnegan High School who often checks up on Mr. Young and his class in case he'll have a chance at firing him due to his young age. He is often suspicious and can be quite ditsy, scoring in the 15th percentile of the Stanford-Binet IQ Test. He is shown to be quite cheap because in "Mr. School Song", he kept the school's old anthem (which still has old ideals back in the day) and sometimes spends the school's budget on useless things like a statue of himself, including making a teacher out of straw name Mrs. Straupersson to avoid paying for a new teacher. He is also afraid of cinnamon, after an incident during his childhood, and refers to his mother as "mommy", he also believes Atlantic City isn't real while Atlantis is. He is also disrespected by many students. It is implied that he may be the father of Adam and Ivy, due to their hair loss in an episode with a video in which Tater and their mother, Rachel, appear together. In the finale, after Adam revealed he was leaving Finnegan, he admitted he enjoyed Adam's teaching and making high school fun.

Recurring
 Paula Shaw as Ms. Byrne. Ms. Byrne is an elderly, clueless history teacher who is in charge of the science club and school newspaper. She has very bad memory, often shown to forget things that she saw or heard a few seconds ago. She always teaches the same thing every class: The War of 1812, always starting off with the question "Who has heard of the War of 1812?" before all the students raise their hands. It has also been suggested in several episodes that she is extremely old, though she disagrees. Notable examples include "Mr. Younger Man" where she claims to have seen Halley's Comet 6 times already, "Mr. Discovery," where she is shown being alive in the prehistoric ages, and in "Mr. Servant", where she is seen to have been "Miss Constantinople. "Mr Summer Vacation" showed her complaining about having to put on sunscreen, causing Adam to ask if it was because she was born before people knew about the dangers of the sun, to which Ms. Byrne replied "No, before there was a sun!". She also uses ancient tools (for example, a 4000-year abacus instead of a computer, being seemingly ignorant of modern technology). It is revealed that her mother and even her grandmother are still alive and she also has many elderly grandchildren. In the finale, she swallowed some water from the Fountain of Youth, appearing young for a while. After it wore off, she began a relationship with Dang's mentor in Vietnam.
Raugi Yu as Dang. Dang is the school's janitor. He usually appears out of nowhere when people mention his name due to his sheer speed followed by him phrasing "You Called?", which allows him to perform actions, such as playing beach volleyball, with himself. He is very skilled at martial arts and is also shown to have a hatred for leaf monkeys, Halloween, and says the word "demon" for things like robots, calling them "steel demons". Occasionally he wears a giant purple cowboy hat with feathers, which he calls his "Fancy Hat". He lives at Finnegan High and almost never wants to leave because leaf monkeys do not live there, who would steal his fancy hat. Dang has a twin brother named Ding that he disliked because Ding married a duck named Shirley. Dang forgave his brother who was Echo disguised as Dang (Dang could not tell the difference between the disguised Echo and his brother) because he saw Slab's mother and exclaimed, "There are worse things to marry than duck!". In the finale, he finally earned his high school diploma from his final science project (his amazing speeding ability) and currently attends Adam's science class at a local university.
 Anna Galvin as Rachel Young. Rachel is Ivy's and Adam's mother. She delivers meals to seniors and can sometimes be helpful. She can be overtly dishonest, claiming during the school carnival that there was a "giant man-eating chicken" in her booth when in reality there was only a tall man eating from a bucket of chicken. Rachel is shown on occasion to be indifferent to Adam's feelings, once selling his comic book collection without his knowledge. She was schoolmates with Principal Tater once and was framed and suspended for putting glue in the mascot costume which made Tater bald. She was also once a cheerleader at Finnegan High.
 Brett Dier as Hutch Anderson. Hutch is Ivy's crush and is on and off as Ivy's boyfriend (he has had other girlfriends). He is very gentleman-like and is a lifeguard and tried to save Adam (who was dressed like a mummy) because of his oath. He helped Ivy's mother take out the trash in one episode. He played Romeo in the school play Romeo and Juliet, but had to leave because Ivy put itching powder makeup on him to stop him from kissing Echo.

Production
The series was created and executive produced by Dan Signer. The series was filmed in front of a live studio audience at 5828 Byrne Road, in Burnaby, British Columbia.

The series began taping on Thursday, September 30, 2010 and production of Season 1 was completed on Friday, April 15, 2011. Through their Facebook page, YTV announced on March 31, 2011, that Mr. Young was the No. 1 show on their network. On April 29, 2011, the series was renewed for a second season. Filming of Season 2 began in early July 2011 and continued through to January 2012.Afterwards, the show had a third season of 28 episodes, bringing the episode total to 80 episodes. This third and final season aired from October 16, 2012, to November 28, 2013.

Broadcast and release
On September 7, 2011, Corus Entertainment's Nelvana Enterprises and Thunderbird Films announced that they had sold the live-action comedy series to Disney XD channels United States, United Kingdom, Ireland, South Africa, Australia, and New Zealand. Nelvana Enterprises is the international distribution agent for Mr. Young, while Nelvana and Thunderbird are co-distributing the series in the United States.

References

External links
 Official Mr. Young television series webpage at the official YTV channel website.
 Official Mr. Young television series webpage at "Facebook" social network.
 

2010s Canadian high school television series
2010s Canadian teen sitcoms
2011 Canadian television series debuts
2013 Canadian television series endings
English-language television shows
YTV (Canadian TV channel) original programming
Television series about teenagers
Television series by Nelvana
Television series created by Dan Signer
Television shows filmed in Burnaby